Convolvulus scammonia, known commonly as scammony, is a bindweed native to the countries of the eastern part of the Mediterranean basin; it grows in bushy waste places, from Syria in the south to the Crimea in the north, its range extending westward to the Greek islands, but not to northern Africa or Italy.  It is a twining perennial, bearing flowers like those of Convolvulus arvensis, and having irregularly arrow-shaped leaves and a thick fleshy root.

The dried juice, virgin scammony, obtained by incision of the living root, has been used in traditional medicine as scammonium, but the variable quality of the drug has led to the employment of scammoniae resina, which is obtained from the dried root by digestion with alcohol. Upon consumption, the resin is inert until it has passed from the stomach into the duodenum, where it meets the bile.  A chemical reaction occurs between it and taurocholate and glycocholate in the bile, whereby it is converted into a powerful purgative which in high doses becomes a violent gastrointestinal irritant.  Scammony kills both roundworm and tapeworm, especially the former, and it was therefore used as an anthelmintic.

The principal bioactive component is the glucoside scammonin (also known as jalapin, molecular formula C34H56O16).

References

Resins
scammonia
Flora of Lebanon
Medicinal plants
Plants described in 1753
Taxa named by Carl Linnaeus